Saskatoon Fairview is a provincial electoral district for the Legislative Assembly of Saskatchewan, Canada. The district includes the neighbourhoods of Kensington, Parkridge, Pacific Heights, Blairmore S. C., Confederation Park and part of Massey Place. Contrary to the name, the neighbourhood of Fairhaven is not part of the riding.

The riding was created prior to the 1982 election from parts of Biggar, Saskatoon Westmount and Saskatoon Riversdale.

Members of the Legislative Assembly

Election results

 

|-

 

 

^ Change is not based on redistributed results

|-

|NDP
|Andy Iwanchuk
|align="right"|2,397
|align="right"|46.22
|align="right"|-5.06

 

|-

| style="width: 130px" |NDP
|Andy Iwanchuk
|align="right"|3,272
|align="right"|51.28
|align="right"|-4.00

|Prog. Conservative
|James Yachyshen
|align="right"|94
|align="right"|1.47
|align="right"|+0.56
 

|-

| style="width: 130px" |NDP
|Andy Iwanchuk
|align="right"|3,105
|align="right"|55.28
|align="right"|+8.11

|Prog. Conservative
|Gwen Katzman
|align="right"|51
|align="right"|0.91
|align="right"|-

|- bgcolor="white"
!align="left" colspan=3|Total
!align="right"|5,617
!align="right"|100.00
!align="right"|

|-

| style="width: 130px" |NDP
|Andy Iwanchuk
|align="right"|1,428
|align="right"|47.17
|align="right"|-9.51

|- bgcolor="white"
!align="left" colspan=3|Total
!align="right"|3,027
!align="right"|100.00
!align="right"|

|-

| style="width: 130px" |NDP
|Chris Axworthy
|align="right"|2,653
|align="right"|56.68
|align="right"|-7.55

|Prog. Conservative
|Gwen Katzman
|align="right"|153
|align="right"|3.27
|align="right"|-

|- bgcolor="white"
!align="left" colspan=3|Total
!align="right"|4,681
!align="right"|100.00
!align="right"|

|-

| style="width: 130px" |NDP
|Chris Axworthy
|align="right"|1,871
|align="right"|64.23
|align="right"|-0.56

|- bgcolor="white"
!align="left" colspan=3|Total
!align="right"|2,913
!align="right"|100.00
!align="right"|

|-

| style="width: 130px" |NDP
|Bob Mitchell
|align="right"|3,100
|align="right"|64.79
|align="right"|-1.79

|Prog. Conservative
|Tom McConnell
|align="right"|406
|align="right"|8.48
|align="right"|-1.64

|- bgcolor="white"
!align="left" colspan=3|Total
!align="right"|4,785
!align="right"|100.00
!align="right"|

|-

| style="width: 130px" |NDP
|Bob Mitchell
|align="right"|5,955
|align="right"|66.58
|align="right"|+6.11

|Prog. Conservative
|Gaby Akl
|align="right"|905
|align="right"|10.12
|align="right"|-21.03
|- bgcolor="white"
!align="left" colspan=3|Total
!align="right"|8,944
!align="right"|100.00
!align="right"|

|-

| style="width: 130px" |NDP
|Bob Mitchell
|align="right"|6,539
|align="right"|60.47
|align="right"|+26.31

|Prog. Conservative
|Ross G. McQuarrie
|align="right"|3,368
|align="right"|31.15
|align="right"|-30.42

|- bgcolor="white"
!align="left" colspan=3|Total
!align="right"|10,813
!align="right"|100.00
!align="right"|

|-

| style="width: 130px" |Prog. Conservative
|Ray Weiman
|align="right"|6,185
|align="right"|61.57
|align="right"|*

|NDP
|Bob Mitchell
|align="right"|3,432
|align="right"|34.16
|align="right"|*

|- bgcolor="white"
!align="left" colspan=3|Total
!align="right"|10,046
!align="right"|100.00
!align="right"|

References

External links
 Website of the Legislative Assembly of Saskatchewan
 Elections Saskatchewan: Official Results of the 2007 Provincial Election
 Elections Saskatchewan: Official Results of the 2011 Provincial Election
 Saskatchewan Archives Board: Election Results By Electoral Division

Saskatchewan provincial electoral districts
Politics of Saskatoon